Bethany is a farm community which lies 7 miles southeast of Campton the county seat of Wolfe County, KY. Its elevation in 830 feet and its population is approximately 300. It is home to Bethany Christian Mission. A small private school serving approximately 30 students. Bethany is known for its rolling hills and cattle farms.

References

Unincorporated communities in Wolfe County, Kentucky
Unincorporated communities in Kentucky